The Christian Democratic Student League is a Swedish Christian democratic organisation for university students. The organisation was founded in 2000, and they are active proponents for eliminating the obligatory study-group membership laws.

In 2003, the organisation joined with the right-wing party's student organisations to cooperate for a change in government. The organisation had at the end of 2005: 121 members and 7 regional organisations.

Chairmen

2000–2001 Douglas Brommesson
2001–2003 Erik Augustin
2003–2006 Patrick E Vigren
2006–2008 Erik Bengtson
2008–2010 Aron Modig
2010–2011 Kalle Bäck
2011–2012 Erik Unogård
2012–2013 Jessica Presits
2013–2015 Andreas Brager
2015–2017 David Sikström
2017–2018 Louise Björnsson
2018–2019 Samuel Dalevi
2019–2020 David Rosemar
2020–2021 Alexander Mattebo
2021–Lucas Svärd

External links
 Christian Democratic Student League 

Christian Democrats (Sweden)